Astérisque is a mathematical journal published by Société Mathématique de France and founded in 1973. It publishes mathematical monographs, conference reports, and the annual report of the Séminaire Nicolas Bourbaki.

External links

Astérisque – AMS Bookstore – American Mathematical Society

Société Mathématique de France academic journals
Mathematics journals
Publications established in 1973
English-language journals
Irregular journals